Joshua Matthew Arnold (born May 16, 1978) is a radio personality who appears on The Bob & Tom Show. He is originally from Fenton, Missouri.

Professional career
Arnold is a professional comedian and was named the best male comedian in the St. Louis area in 2011. Prior to becoming a comedian he worked for Rawlings and taught English in South Korea for almost two years.

The Bob and Tom Show
Arnold joined The Bob & Tom Show on August 1, 2016, replacing Scott Potasnik after several weeks of guest hosting. Arnold had made numerous appearances as a guest on the show prior to joining it.

References

External links
 Thatjosharnold.com
 Josh Arnold Twitter
 Bob and Tom Official Website
 

Living people
1978 births